Rob Lewis (born 2 November 1982) is an English composer, producer and multi-instrumentalist.  His compositions for looping cello formed the basis of his critically acclaimed album ‘Momentum’ in 2018.  In 2019 he was commissioned by Google to compose a 60-minute soundtrack as part of an installation in Los Angeles.  Excerpts from this composition formed his second album ’98’, released in February 2020.

TV and film
Lewis has composed soundtracks for numerous TV shows and short films including Hulu's Dead Asleep directed by Skye Borgman, Channel 4's Inside the American Embassy, Genderquake, and the independent feature documentary '‘Perception'’ following the work of Egyptian artist El Seed. He has also collaborated with BAFTA winner David Holmes.  He partnered with augmented reality company Magic Leap on their first in-house narrative film The Last Light due for showing at SXSW festival.  In 2017 he scored H&M and Erdem's joint campaign directed by Baz Luhrmann.

Education
Lewis began playing the cello at the age of 6.  He read music at University of Sussex, and cello at The Guildhall School of Music and Drama with teacher Selma Gokcen. He has taken masterclasses with Bernard Greenhouse, Raphael Wallfisch, and Karine Georgian.

Recordings
Released in 2018, his debut album Momentum is a collection of 10 tracks for looping cello inspired by nature, humanity and the constant strife between the two.  The album received support on BBC 6 Music from Mary Anne Hobbs and Tom Ravenscroft.  It was also described as "Strikingly Beautiful" by Clash magazine. 

Momentum was featured in the show ‘Harmonic’, performed at Kew Gardens, London in the summer of 2018.  The show was created by Cirque Bijou and featured aerialist Korri Aulakh.  It was subsequently performed in Shanghai in 2019 and Bristol Harbour Festival. Lewis also performed Momentum at WOMAD festival. The Ambient Zone also released two remixed versions of tracks from Momentum. "The Sea" from the album was captured as part of the 'Unpicked' series, recorded at Abbey Road Studios. 

Lewis's second album 98 centres around the concept of cell regeneration and the evolution of mankind, with each track focusing on a different area of the human mind and body. It forms part of the 60-minute score Lewis composed for Google's Room 98.

Music from Momentum and 98 has been used on a number of TV shows, adverts and films.  Lewis's compositions have also featured on fashion shows by Gucci, Givenchy and Alexander McQueen

Cellist
As a session musician and artist, Lewis has performed and collaborated with artists including Noel Gallagher, Anna Calvi, Dave, SBTRKT, Ghostpoet, Beardyman, Jason Mraz, Massive Attack and many more.  He is endorsed by Yamaha Music.

SmartScales iOS App
In 2015 Lewis co-founded Greater Heights Media to create the award-winning app ‘SmartScales’ . The App aims to make learning scales and arpeggios more accessible and enjoyable.  In 2016, Apple made it ’Best New App’, and the app reached number 15 in the US and Asia app charts.  The app also received five-star reviews from The Strad magazine, BBC Music Magazine and Sinfini Music.

References

External links
Official website

1982 births
English cellists
English electronic musicians
English record producers
Living people
English film score composers
English male film score composers